Glenquicken stone circle or Billy Diamond's Bridge stone circle is an oval stone circle with a central pillar, two miles east of Creetown, Dumfries and Galloway. The outer ring is formed of 29 stones. Aubrey Burl has called it "the finest of all centre-stone circles." It is a scheduled monument.

Two other circles to the north-west were marked on the Six-inch First Edition Ordnance Survey map. Alexander Thom planned these in 1939, but they are no longer visible.

See also 
Stone circles in the British Isles and Brittany
List of stone circles
Scheduled monuments in Dumfries and Galloway

References

Stone circles in Dumfries and Galloway
Scheduled Ancient Monuments in Dumfries and Galloway